Jin Sha may refer to:

Jin Sha (poet) (born 1924), or Cheng Youshu, Chinese diplomat and poet
Jin Sha (singer) (born 1981), or Kym, Chinese singer and actress

See also
Jinsha (disambiguation)